Streptolophus is a genus of plants in the grass family. The only known species is Streptolophus sagittifolius, found only in Angola.

References

Panicoideae
Monotypic Poaceae genera
Endemic flora of Angola